Norsup is an island across the bay from the village with the same name on Malakula Island in Malampa Province, Vanuatu.

It is located near Lakatoro, the capital of Malampa Province.

Population
According to the 2009 census, it has a population of 88 inhabitants.

Transportation
The village and surrounding area are served by Norsup Airport, one of three airports of the island. Others are Lamap Airport and South West Bay Airport.

References

Populated places in Vanuatu
Malampa Province